Praxis Care (formerly Praxis Care Group) is the largest care providing charity based in Northern Ireland. It has its headquarters in Belfast.  Four charities initially made up the former Praxis Care Group: Praxis Mental Health, for those experiencing mental ill health such as clinical depression or schizophrenia; Respond, for older people including those suffering from dementia; Challenge, which deals with service users with learning disabilities; and the Northern Ireland Agoraphobia and Anxiety Society (although this is a separate charity in its own right, Praxis provides management and support to it).

Activities 
Praxis Care provides a range of accommodation and support services for services users, including residential and supported living, domiciliary care, floating support, home response, drop-in centres, an advocacy project, a befriending department and workskills projects.  Praxis Care has a dedicated in-house research department which monitors issues as diverse as staff and service user satisfaction and the evaluation of schemes, as well as doing research into relevant issues.

The organisation also has its own in-house staff development department, which is responsible for regularly inducting new staff and for providing other relevant training, primarily though not exclusively to ensure that care staff are adequately trained for their work, which can involve dealing with complex needs and challenging behaviours.  Other departments include quality and governance, human resources, development, finance, fundraising / PR and administration.

The organisation runs schemes across Northern Ireland, the Isle of Man, England and the Republic of Ireland, and is constantly developing. The revenue for Praxis Care in 2018 was £33.9 million. Revenue is expected to reach £45m in 2019. 

Nevin Ringland founded the original Praxis Mental Health in 1981 and retired in March 2019. Nevin Ringland became the Patron of Praxis Care, while Andy Mayhew took over as chief executive. Mayhew is supported by a team of directors and assistant directors.  All in all, the organisation employs about 1,500 people and was named as one of Northern Ireland's 'Top 50 Employers' in 2012. The majority of its employees are in care roles, although a significant minority are involved in support services.

See also 
 Mental health in the United Kingdom

References

External links
 Praxis Care website

Charities based in Northern Ireland
Mental health organisations in the United Kingdom